Alaverdi Futsal, was an Armenian professional futsal club based in the town of Alaverdi, Lori Province.

History
Alaverdi Futsal club was founded in 2015 with the assistance of Alaverdi City Council, as well as the member of Parliament Eduard Sharmazanov who is a native of Alaverdi. The club participated in the 2015–16 season of the Armenian Futsal Premier League, occupying the 6th place among 7 participants in their inaugural season. They played their home games at the Oleg Gorbunov Sports School of Alaverdi. They appear to have folded before the 2018–2019 season as they do not appear in the league statistics for that season and the last YouTube video posted of them playing is from April 2018.

Season by season

References

2015 establishments in Armenia
Futsal clubs established in 2015
Alaverdi